Stenodacma cognata is a moth of the family Pterophoridae that is found in the Democratic Republic of the Congo (Haut-Katanga).

References

Moths described in 2009
Oxyptilini
Insects of the Democratic Republic of the Congo
Moths of Africa
Taxa named by Cees Gielis
Endemic fauna of the Democratic Republic of the Congo